Edgar Isaac Seligman (14 April 1867 – 27 September 1958) was a British épée, foil, and sabre fencer. After the family moved to London he became a British citizen by naturalisation.

Seligman competed in five Olympiads and won two silver medals as a member of the British fencing team despite not making his Olympic debut until age 39. At the British Fencing Championships, he won all of the divisions two times, making him the only competitor to accomplish this, although (Bill Hoskyns has more combined titles).

Early and personal life

Seligman was born in San Francisco, California, in the United States, to German parents, and was Jewish. His father was Leopold Seligman. After his family moved to London, England, he became a British citizen by naturalisation.

With the Imperial Yeomanry, Seligman took part in the Boer War. His brother was Brigadier General Herbert Seligman who served in the Royal Artillery.

As a painter, Seligman had artwork shown at the Fine Art Society and Royal Academy.

Fencing career

British Championships
At the British Championships, Seligman won the epee event in 1904 and 1906. He later won the foil event from 1906 to 1907 while also winning the sabre event in 1923 and 1924.

Intercalated Games
At the 1906 Intercalated Games, Seligman competed in the team épée with Great Britain and won a silver medal.

1908 London Olympic Games
At the 1908 Summer Olympics, Seligman reached the first round in the individual épée while placing in second with the British team in the team épée.

1912 Stockholm Olympic Games
As captain, Seligman competed in three events during the 1912 Summer Olympics. In individual events, Seligman came in sixth in both the foil and épée. With the British team, Seligman was second in the team épée.

1920 Antwerp Games
Seligman competed at the 1920 Antwerp Games as captain of the British fencing team. During these games, the British team were 5th in the épée and 7th in the foil.

1924 Paris Olympic Games
Seligman returned as captain of the British fencing team at the 1924 Summer Olympics. In individual events, Seligman reach the semifinals in the sabre and the final in the foil.
For team events, Seligman and Great Britain made it to the quarterfinals. Seligman did not compete in the sabre or epee team events for Great Britain due to a leg injury that occurred in the foil event.

1928 and 1932 Olympic Games
At the Art competitions at the 1928 Summer Olympics and Art competitions at the 1932 Summer Olympics, Seligman competed in the Mixed Painting Art Competitions.

See also
 List of select Jewish fencers

References

External links
 
 
 British Olympic Association record
 British Olympic Association bio
 Jews in Sports bio

1867 births
1958 deaths
British male fencers
Jewish male épée fencers
Jewish male foil fencers
Jewish male sabre fencers
Jewish British sportspeople
British people of German-Jewish descent
Olympic fencers of Great Britain
Olympic silver medallists for Great Britain
Olympic medalists in fencing
Medalists at the 1906 Intercalated Games
Medalists at the 1908 Summer Olympics
Medalists at the 1912 Summer Olympics
Fencers at the 1906 Intercalated Games
Fencers at the 1908 Summer Olympics
Fencers at the 1912 Summer Olympics
Fencers at the 1920 Summer Olympics
Fencers at the 1924 Summer Olympics
British Yeomanry soldiers
Fencers from San Francisco
Naturalised citizens of the United Kingdom
British artists
Olympic competitors in art competitions